Henri Honsia (26 May 1913 – 6 February 2004) was a Belgian sprint canoeist who competed in the late 1930s. At the 1936 Summer Olympics in Berlin, he was eliminated in the heats of the K-1 1000 m event.

References

1913 births
2004 deaths
Belgian male canoeists
Canoeists at the 1936 Summer Olympics
Olympic canoeists of Belgium
20th-century Belgian people